The 1997 USISL A-League was an American Division II league run by the United Systems of Independent Soccer Leagues during the summer of 1997.

Overview
At the end of the 1996 A-League season, the U.S. second division A-League collapsed.  Six of the seven teams in the A-League then joined the USISL which had three leagues in 1996, beginning with the third division USISL Select League.  With the collapse of the U.S. second division and the transfer of most of its teams to the USISL, the USISL reorganized its divisions to include the new teams.  It moved most of the old second division USISL Select League, plus a few new teams, up to a second division level and merged the old A-League teams into this new U.S. second division which was renamed the USISL A-League.

Regular season

Northeast Division

Atlantic Division

Central Division

Pacific Division

Division Semi-finals

Northeast Semifinal 1

Long Island advances to the Division final

Northeast Semifinal 2

Montreal advances to the Division final

Atlantic Semifinal 1

Carolina advances to the Division final

Atlantic Semifinal 2

Hershey advances to the Division final

Central Semifinal 1

New Orleans advances to the Division final

Central Semifinal 2

Milwaukee advances to the Division final

Pacific Semifinal 1

Seattle advances to the Division final

Pacific Semifinal 2

Vancouver advances to the Division final

Division Finals

Northeast Division final

Atlantic Division final

Central Division final

Pacific Division final

Conference finals

Eastern Conference

The Carolina Dynamo advance.

Western Conference

The Milwaukee Rampage advance, winning two out of three games.

Final

MVP: Carmine Isacco, Milwaukee Rampage

Points leaders

Honors
 MVP: Doug Miller
 Leading goal scorer: Doug Miller
 Leading goalkeeper: Dusty Hudock
 Rookie of the Year: Stern John
 Coach of the Year: Bob Lilley
First Team All League
Goalkeeper: Dusty Hudock
Defenders: John Limniatis, Scott Schweitzer, Mark Watson, Travis Rinker
Midfielders: Yari Allnutt, Mauro Biello, Garret Kusch
Forwards: Mark Baena, Doug Miller, Stern John
Second Team All League
Goalkeeper: Paolo Ceccarelli
Defenders: Don Gramenz, Robert Rosario, Bill Sedgewick, Dian Anguelov
Midfielders: John Smith, Nick DeSantis, Domenic Mobilio
Forwards: Steve Patterson, Darren Tilley, Mike Gailey

References

External links
 A-League 1997 Season
 The Year in American Soccer – 1997
 United Soccer Leagues (RSSSF)

2
1997 in Canadian soccer
1997